Shamrock SC is an amateur soccer team based in Queens, New York, United States. The club was founded in 1960 by Irish immigrants in New York and currently plays in Division 1 of the Cosmopolitan Soccer League. In February 2014, the club was formally honored by the Irish Government for their contribution to soccer and promotion of Irish culture in New York City during the inaugural Irish American Soccer Hall of Fame awards.

References

Cosmopolitan Soccer League
1960 establishments in New York City
Association football clubs established in 1960
German-American Soccer League
Men's soccer clubs in New York (state)
Irish-American culture in New York City
Irish-American culture in sports
Diaspora soccer clubs in the United States